Balvi Municipality is a municipality in northern Latgale, Latvia. The municipality was formed in 2009 from parts of the Balvi District, by merging Balvi parish, Bērzkalne parish, Bērzpils parish, Briežuciems parish, Krišjāņi parish, Kubuļi parish, Lazduleja parish, Tilža parish, Vectilža parish, Vīksna parish and the town of Balvi, which became the administrative center.

As a part of the 2021 Latvian administrative reform, the municipalities of Balvi, Baltinava, Rugāji and Viļaka were merged into the new Balvi Municipality. Coincidentally, the new municipality shares the same borders as the former Balvi District.

Images

See also 
 Administrative divisions of Latvia (2009)

References 

 
Municipalities of Latvia